Håkan Parkman (1955–1988) was a Swedish composer, arranger, and choral director. From 1980 to 1988 he led the Uppsala vokalensemble. He died in a drowning accident off the coast of Gotland and is buried in the Uppsala old cemetery.
He was the brother of Stefan Parkman.

Works, editions and recordings
 Three Shakespeare songs

References

Swedish composers
Swedish male composers
1955 births
1988 deaths
20th-century classical musicians
20th-century composers
Burials at Uppsala old cemetery
20th-century Swedish male musicians
20th-century Swedish musicians